Western Palatinate or West Palatinate is a sub-region in the west of the Palatinate, a German cultural and historic region in the state of Rhineland-Palatinate. It includes the western part of the Palatine Forest, the central part of the North Palatine Uplands, the West Palatine Moor and the Westrich Plateau. Its former name of "Further Palatinate" (Hinterpfalz), which emerged during the time of  Bavarian rule in 1816 and was viewed by the local population as very discriminatory, is only commonly used in the Anterior Palatinate (Vorderpfalz).

Geography 
The following counties and independent towns or cities lie wholly or partly in the Western Palatinate::
 County of Kaiserslautern
 City of Kaiserslautern
 County of Kusel
 Town of Landstuhl
 Town of Pirmasens
 County of Südwestpfalz 
 Town of Zweibrücken

The county of Donnersbergkreis and the old counties of Rockenhausen and Kirchheimbolanden were also counted as part of the Western Palatinate in the widest sense, but are often viewed as an independent region (North Palatinate or Nordpfalz).

A different definition also existed for the division of the police force: the Police District of West Palatinate (Polizeipräsidium Westpfalz) looked after just the western part of Donnersbergkreis county (roughly corresponding to the old county of Rockenhausen) as well as the collective municipality of Meisenheim in the county of Bad Kreuznach as well as the above administrative regions.

Population 
Almost 550,000 people live in West Palatinate, including around 30,000 foreigners. There are also around 50,000 Americans living in the greater Kaiserslautern area, who are not recorded in the official population statistics. They form the largest US community outside the United States. By far the largest city and the upper center of the region is Kaiserslautern with around 102,000 inhabitants, followed by Pirmasens and Zweibrücken. The following list lists the largest settlements in the region:

References

External links 
 Planungsgemeinschaft Westpfalz (PGW)

 
Geography of Rhineland-Palatinate